The Parker House is a historic house on United States Route 425, two miles south of Star City, Arkansas.  The two story house was built in 1927 by Robert Preston Parker, and it exhibits International style with Mediterranean elements, and extremely unusual styling for a rural setting in southeastern Arkansas.  Parker, its builder and first occupant, was a civil engineer with extensive railroad experience.  He was responsible for surveying Star City and naming most of its streets, as well as designing a number of other local buildings.

The house was listed on the National Register of Historic Places in 2000.

See also
National Register of Historic Places listings in Lincoln County, Arkansas

References

Houses on the National Register of Historic Places in Arkansas
Mission Revival architecture in Arkansas
International style architecture in Arkansas
Houses completed in 1927
Houses in Lincoln County, Arkansas
National Register of Historic Places in Lincoln County, Arkansas
1927 establishments in Arkansas